David Joseph Freitas (born March 18, 1989) is an American professional baseball catcher in the Los Angeles Dodgers organization. He has previously played in Major League Baseball (MLB) for the Atlanta Braves, Seattle Mariners, and Milwaukee Brewers, and in the KBO League for the Kiwoom Heroes.

Career

Early career
Freitas was born in Wilton, California. He attended Elk Grove High School in Elk Grove, California, and then Cosumnes River College, where he played college baseball for two years, earning All-American honors. He then transferred to the University of Hawaii, where he continued his college baseball career with the Hawaii Rainbow Warriors.

Washington Nationals
The Washington Nationals selected Freitas in the 15th round of the 2010 Major League Baseball draft. Playing for the Hagerstown Suns of the Class A South Atlantic League in 2011, he started in the all-star game. He began the 2012 season with the Potomac Nationals of the Class A-Advanced Carolina League.

Oakland Athletics
On August 3, 2012, the Nationals traded Freitas to the Athletics for Kurt Suzuki. He split the 2013 season between the Midland RockHounds of the Class AA Texas League and the Sacramento River Cats of the Class AAA Pacific Coast League (PCL).

Baltimore Orioles
The Athletics traded Freitas to the Baltimore Orioles on December 12, 2013, as the player to be named later in trade that also sent Jemile Weeks to the Orioles for Jim Johnson. With the Orioles' organization, Freitas played for the Bowie Baysox of the Class AA Eastern League and Norfolk Tides of the Class AAA International League.

Chicago Cubs
After the 2015 season, the Cubs selected Freitas in the Triple-A phase of the Rule 5 draft. Freitas began the 2016 season with the Tennessee Smokies of the Class AA Southern League. He was later promoted to the Iowa Cubs of the PCL.

Atlanta Braves
On November 11, 2016, Freitas signed a minor league contract with the Atlanta Braves. He played for the Gwinnett Braves of the International League. The Braves promoted Freitas to the major leagues on August 30, 2017, and he made his major league debut in the second game of a double header against the Philadelphia Phillies that same day. Freitas got his first major league hit, a double in his second at-bat.

Seattle Mariners
On October 27, 2017, the Seattle Mariners claimed Freitas off of waivers. In 2018 for Seattle, Freitas batted .215/.277/.312 with 1 home run and 5 RBI in 36 big league games. Freitas began the 2019 season with the Triple-A Tacoma Rainiers, and registered only 4 hitless plate appearances for the Mariners.

Milwaukee Brewers
On April 14, 2019, the Mariners traded Freitas to the Milwaukee Brewers in exchange for Sal Biasi. The Brewers assigned Freitas to the San Antonio Missions of the PCL. Splitting the season with the Tacoma Rainiers and San Antonio, Freitas won the Pacific Coast League batting title with a .387 average as part of a torrid .387/.459/.571 slash line in 91 games in the PCL. He also appeared in 16 major league games for Milwaukee, notching 1 hit in 13 at-bats. He did not appear in a game in the 2020 season.

Kiwoom Heroes
On February 5, 2021, Freitas signed a one-year, $600,000 deal with the Kiwoom Heroes of the KBO League. Freitas played in 43 games for Kiwoom, slashing .259/.297/.374 with 2 home runs and 14 RBI before he was released on June 24.

Tampa Bay Rays
On July 24, 2021, Freitas signed a minor league contract with the Tampa Bay Rays.

Freitas spent the 2021 season with the Triple-A Durham Bulls. He played in 16 games, hitting .245 with 3 RBI's. Freitas became a free agent following the season.

New York Yankees
On December 23, 2021, Freitas signed a minor league contract with the New York Yankees. He played for the Scranton/Wilkes-Barre RailRiders until he was released on July 13, 2022.

Los Angeles Dodgers
On January 5, 2023, Freitas signed a minor league contract with the Los Angeles Dodgers organization.

Personal life
Freitas grew up a fan of the Athletics. David married his college sweetheart Kacee Freitas in 2013. They have a son named Owen who was born in 2015.

References

External links

Living people
1989 births
People from Sacramento County, California
Baseball players from California
Major League Baseball catchers
Atlanta Braves players
Seattle Mariners players
Milwaukee Brewers players
Cosumnes River Hawks baseball players
Hawaii Rainbow Warriors baseball players
Vermont Lake Monsters players
Hagerstown Suns players
Potomac Nationals players
Midland RockHounds players
Sacramento River Cats players
Mesa Solar Sox players
Norfolk Tides players
Bowie Baysox players
Iowa Cubs players
Tennessee Smokies players
Gwinnett Braves players
Tacoma Rainiers players
San Antonio Missions players
American expatriate baseball players in South Korea
Kiwoom Heroes players
Scranton/Wilkes-Barre RailRiders players
Florida Complex League Rays players
Durham Bulls players